Arthur MacArthur III (June 1, 1876 – December 2, 1923) was a United States Navy officer, whose active-duty career extended from the Spanish–American War through World War I. He was an elder brother of General Douglas MacArthur (1880–1964).

Biography
A son of United States Army General Arthur MacArthur Jr. (1845–1912), he chose a career in the Navy instead of following his father, graduating from the United States Naval Academy in 1896.

During the Spanish–American War, Ensign MacArthur served aboard the steam yacht  in the Battle of Santiago. He later participated in naval operations during the Philippine–American War and the Boxer Rebellion.

On August 21, 1902, in Newport, Rhode Island, he married Mary Hendry McCalla (1877–1959), the daughter of Rear Admiral Bowman H. McCalla. His brother Douglas, a cadet at the United States Military Academy at the time, was his best man. Arthur and Mary MacArthur had five children, Arthur (1904–1912), Bowman McCalla, Douglas (named in honor of his brother), Mary Elizabeth, and Malcolm (who died while attending the Naval Academy in 1933).

From 1901 to 1903, MacArthur commanded the torpedo boat . While in this capacity, he was involved in early submarine boat testing.

In November 1901, he was aboard the Fulton when it set an underwater endurance record of 15 hours on the bottom of Peconic Bay, New York.

Later, he was injured when, on a run from New Suffolk, New York, to Washington, D.C., to exhibit the submarine to naval committees of the House and Senate, the Fulton experienced a battery explosion off the Delaware Breakwater.

He was transferred to the battleship  prior to her commissioning in October 1904, making him a plank owner, and served aboard her until September 1906, when he was transferred to the United States Naval Academy. At the Naval Academy, he served initially as aide to the superintendent, Admiral James H. Sands and subsequently on the staff for the commandant of midshipmen. His other commands included destroyer , minelayer , armored cruiser  and light cruiser .

For distinguished service in protecting convoys from U-boats engaged in the Atlantic U-boat Campaign during 1918, he was awarded the Navy Cross and the Distinguished Service Medal. He was promoted to captain on January 1, 1921. MacArthur was a hereditary member of the Military Order of the Loyal Legion of the United States by right of his father's having served as a Union officer in the Civil War. Captain MacArthur died in Washington, D.C., of appendicitis in 1923, and was buried in Arlington National Cemetery near his parents.

Awards
 Navy Cross
 Navy Distinguished Service Medal
 Sampson Medal
 Spanish Campaign Medal
 China Campaign Medal
 Philippine Campaign Medal
 World War I Victory Medal

Navy Cross Citation
"For distinguished service in the line of his profession as commanding officer of the U.S.S. Chattanooga engaged in the important, exacting and hazardous duty of transporting and escorting troops and supplies to European ports through waters infested with enemy submarines and mines."

Dates of rank
 Midshipman, United States Naval Academy – 6 September 1892
 Ensign – 6 May 1898
 Lieutenant (junior grade) – 6 May 1901
 Lieutenant – 3 March 1903
 Lieutenant Commander – 25 February 1909
 Commander – 17 August 1915
 Captain – 1 January 1921

References

1876 births
1923 deaths
Recipients of the Navy Cross (United States)
Recipients of the Navy Distinguished Service Medal
United States Naval Academy alumni
United States Navy officers
United States Navy personnel of the Spanish–American War
United States Navy personnel of World War I
American people of Scottish descent
American military personnel of the Boxer Rebellion
Arthur III
Burials at Arlington National Cemetery
American military personnel of the Philippine–American War